Saioni is a surname. Notable people with the surname include: 

Christophe Saioni (born 1969), French skier
Maruša Ferk Saioni (born 1988), Slovenian skier